Charles Kay (born Charles Piff, 31 August 1930) is an English actor.

Early life
Kay was born in Coventry, Warwickshire, the son of Frances (née Petty) and Charles Beckingham Piff.

Originally educated at Warwick School, Kay went on to study medicine, then decided to train for the stage. He went to the Royal Academy of Dramatic Art (RADA) and in 1957, after graduation,  joined the Radio Drama Company by winning the Carleton Hobbs Bursary. He went on to join the English Stage Company at the Royal Court Theatre. He created the roles of Jimmy in Arnold Wesker's Roots (1959) and Charles V in John Osborne's Luther (1961). He was also in Wesker's The Kitchen, The Changeling (1961), and Twelfth Night (1962).

Theatre
He joined the Royal Shakespeare Company in 1963 and appeared in Stratford and at the Aldwych, London. He remained until 1966, during which time he portrayed a wide variety of roles, including Octavius Caesar in Julius Caesar, Clarence in The Wars of The Roses, Launcelot Gobbo in The Merchant of Venice, Antipholus of Ephesus in The Comedy of Errors, Osric in the David Warner Hamlet, Dobchinsky in The Government Inspector and Moloch in Robert Bolt's The Thwarting of Baron Bolligrew. He then joined the National Theatre where he played Celia in the all-male production of As You Like It (1967) and appeared in Peter Nichols's The National Health (1969).

Film and television
In film, his highest profile role was as Count Orsini-Rosenberg in the Academy Award winning Amadeus. He also appeared in Kenneth Branagh's Henry V, and the 2002 version of The Importance of Being Earnest.

His numerous appearances on television include Crown Court, Jennie: Lady Randolph Churchill in which he played Montagu Phippen Porch, Fall of Eagles in which he played Tsar Nicholas II, I, Claudius, The Devil's Crown, To Serve Them All My Days, By the Sword Divided, Fortunes of War, Rumpole of the Bailey, The Citadel, Edge of Darkness, The Darling Buds of May, Jonathan Creek, Hetty Wainthropp Investigates, Holby City, Midsomer Murders and The Casebook of Sherlock Holmes story "The Creeping Man".

In 2002, he guest starred in the Doctor Who audio drama Excelis Rising.

Filmography

References

External links

1930 births
Living people
20th-century English male actors
21st-century English male actors
Actors from Coventry
Alumni of RADA
English male film actors
English male stage actors
English male television actors
People educated at Warwick School
Royal Shakespeare Company members